Ashorne is a village in Warwickshire, West Midlands, England and part of the parish of Newbold Pacey. Ashorne Hill House is a large country house which is used as a conference centre.

Cricket team
Ashorne has a cricket side running sides on a Saturday, Sunday and Midweek. The club joins local village Moreton Morrell in being known as Ashorne and Moreton Morrell CC. 'The Horne' as they can also be known play league cricket in the Cotswold Hills Cricket league. Ashorne cricket Club is the only club in England to have to cross a water source, which is called the Thelshold Brook, to get to the clubhouse. It is also the only club in 3 different Villages. The Pitch is in Ashorne, The Clubhouse is in Newbold Pacey and all of the players come from Moreton Morrell.

References

External links

 A Visitors Guide to Ashorne
 Meet England - Ashorne Hill

Villages in Warwickshire
Stratford-on-Avon District